is a former Japanese football player. His brother is Makoto Nishino.

He played for Japanese club Oita Trinita, Mito HollyHock and Fagiano Okayama.

Club Statistics

References

External links 

Kohei Nishino at Yahoo! Japan 

1982 births
Living people
Nippon Bunri University alumni
Association football people from Hyōgo Prefecture
Japanese footballers
J1 League players
J2 League players
Oita Trinita players
Mito HollyHock players
Fagiano Okayama players
Association football forwards